David Akpode Ejoor RCDS, PSC, (10 January 1932 – 10 February 2019) was a  Nigerian Army officer who served as Chief of Army Staff (COAS).

Early life 
He was the first Nigerian Commandant of the Nigerian Defence Academy and was once administrator of the now-defunct Mid-Western Region. Ejoor was the governor of the Mid-Western State of Nigeria, during the Biafra Civil War. He then served as Chief of Army Staff from January 1971 to July 1975. Ejoor died in Lagos on 10 February 2019.  He was 87.

Works
Ejoor David: Reminiscences, 1989

References

External links
Nigerian-army.org, Military biography

Nigerian generals
1932 births
Nigerian Defence Academy Commandants
Nigerian Defence Academy people
2019 deaths
Chiefs of Army Staff (Nigeria)